Martin Brudermüller (born 1961) is a German businessman, and the CEO of BASF since 2018.

Early life
Brudermüller was born in Stuttgart in 1961. He earned a bachelor's degree and a doctorate in chemistry from the University of Karlsruhe, Germany, in 1985 and 1987 respectively. He did postdoctoral research at the University of California, Berkeley, US.

Career
Brudermüller joined BASF in 1988 and worked as a chemist in the ammonia laboratory. In 1993, he moved to the New Business Development / Marketing division in the Intermediates division. In 1995 he was delegated to BASF Italia Spa, Milan, as Head of Marketing and Sales Pharma Intermediates. From 1997 he was staff to the vice chairman of the board. After working as productions director for fat-soluble vitamins in the Fine Chemicals division from 1999, he was promoted in the following years to Senior Vice President Strategic Planning BASF Group and President Functional Polymers Division. Since 2006 he is member of the Board of Executive Directors of BASF Aktiengesellschaft (since January 14, 2008 BASF SE). 

In 2011, Brudermüller became Vice Chairman of the Board of Executive Directors of BASF SE and since 2015 also Chief Technology Officer. Since 2018 he is chairman of the board of executive directors and chief technology officer (CTO) in 2018.

Brudermüller was nominated by the Christian Democratic Union (CDU) as delegate to the Federal Convention for the purpose of electing the President of Germany in 2022.

After Russia invaded Ukraine, Brudermüller strongly opposed a proposed EU ban on Russian gas imports. Brudermüller said it would destroy the German economy. The German central bank said it would reduce German GDP for the year by 5% while other economists said it would reduce German GDP by 0.3 to 3%.

Other activities
 Munich Security Conference (MSC), Member of the Security Innovation Board (since 2021)
 Max Planck Society, Member of the Senate
 European Round Table of Industrialists (ERT), Member

Personal life
Brudermüller has been married since 1993.

References

Living people
BASF people
German chief executives
People in the chemical industry
1961 births
Karlsruhe Institute of Technology alumni
Businesspeople from Stuttgart